A kinetic closest pair data structure is a kinetic data structure that maintains the closest pair of points, given a set P of n points that are moving continuously with time in a metric space. While many efficient algorithms were known in the static case, they proved hard to kinetize, so new static algorithms were developed to solve this problem.

2D case

Approach 1 
The simplest kinetic approach for maintenance of the closest pair is to use variants of the Delaunay triangulations.

Consider a hexagon and partition it into six equilateral triangles, and then create a Delaunay triangulation based on each equilateral triangle, as each one is a convex shape. The union of these six Delaunay triangulations, so called Equilateral Delaunay graph (EDG), is a supergraph for the nearest neighbor graph (NNG); the endpoints of the edge with minimum length in EDG gives the closest pair. It is straightforward to maintain Delaunay triangulations based on convex shapes. Given the EDG over time, by creating a kinetic tournament tree over the edges of the EDG, one can easily maintain the closest pair.

This closest pair KDS is efficient, amortized responsive, and compact, but in general is not local. The following approach presents a local KDS for maintenance of the closest pair.

Approach 2 

The second kinetic approach is based on the following observations.

Divide and conquer

Matched points

Clearly, the closest pair of points is a matched pair.

Thus, the set of pairs of closest points (within this wedge) in the x-direction is a superset of the set of pairs of closest points.

Construction 
 Map each point p=(x, y) in the set P to a new point , forming the set P'  of transformed points.
 Sort the points by x,u and v coordinates, and store them in kinetic sorted lists.
For every node w in the primary tree, let T(w) be the secondary tree associated with w. This range tree will be used to identify the points in the "main" wedge for a point .
 For every node w in the primary tree, and every node e in T(w), calculate the pair (w, e) = (b, r), where b (or r) is defined to be the point with maximum (or minimum) x-coordinate in the left (or right) subtree of e. Let  be the set of (w, e) for all pairs w, e in T. This is a superset of the set of pairs of closest points (within the main wedge).

Maintenance 
Certificate failures can occur in the priority queues and the sorted lists. Swaps in the ordering of the points will cause changes to T (which will take  time), and may cause insertions/deletions in the priority queues.

Note that the number of changes to the sets  as defined above need not be a constant number. However, any pair that starts or stops being matched as a result of the ordering of p and q changing must contain p and/or q, and hence there are only a constant number of matched pairs that must be inserted into/deleted from the priority queues. It is ok to only update these matched pairs since, by definition, only matched pairs have a chance of being the closest pair.

Analysis 
This KDS is:
 Responsive: takes  time to process an event
 Local: since each point is present in a constant number of kinetic sorted lists and kinetic priority queues, locality follows from the locality of those structures
 Compactness: compactness follows from the compactness of the kinetic sorted lists and kinetic priority queues
 Efficient: every swap in the sorted lists causes a constant number of insertions and deletions in the kinetic priority queues. Assuming the motion of the points is pseudo-algebraic, there are a polynomial number of swaps, and hence a polynomial number of events are processed by this KDS, making it efficient

This approach can be used to maintain the closest pair in higher dimensions.

References 

Kinetic data structures
Geometric data structures